is a tramway stop in Sumiyoshi-ku, Osaka, Japan, operated by Hankai Tramway Co., Ltd.

Lines 
Hankai Tramway (HN10)
Hankai Line
Uemachi Line

Structure 
 A side platform is located each side of Sumiyoshi Junction.

 North side of Sumiyoshi Junction
 South side of Sumiyoshi Junction
 East side of Sumiyoshi Junction
 West side of Sumiyoshi Junction

Adjacent stations 

Sumiyoshi
Sumiyoshi